Masturah is a village in Al Madinah Province, in western Saudi Arabia.

References

Populated places in Medina Province (Saudi Arabia)